The Nizampur National Park is situated in the Nowshera District of the Khyber Pakhtunkhwa province in Pakistan.

History
In January 2022, the provincial government declared it a national park, as a step to maintain and preserve the flora and animals as well as their habitats in varied ecosystems. This park includes a land of 5,236 acres, and it comprises Qamar Mela and Khwara blocks in the Peshawar Forest Division.

References

National parks of Pakistan
Nowshera District
Protected areas of Khyber Pakhtunkhwa
Protected areas established in 2022
Parks in Khyber Pakhtunkhwa
2022 establishments in Pakistan